Palpopleura is a genus of dragonflies in the family Libellulidae. Five species are native to sub-Saharan Africa, one ranges widely in southern Asia, and one is a widespread endemic to Madagascar.

Species
The genus contains the following species:

References

Libellulidae
Taxa named by Jules Pierre Rambur
Taxonomy articles created by Polbot